Future Knight is a 2D, flip screen platform game released by Gremlin Graphics in 1986 for the Amstrad CPC, Commodore 64, MSX, and ZX Spectrum. The player must guide Randolph through twenty levels of hostile robots and aliens before defeating Spegbott and rescuing Amelia.

Plot
The space cruiser S.S. Rustbucket has crashed on Planet 2749 of the Zragg System, and its passengers been taken hostage by Spegbott the Terrible and his minions. Among them is the Princess Amelia, beloved of the Future Knight Randolph, who has now teleported into the wreck of the Rustbucket to defeat Spegbott and rescue her.

Gameplay

An undocumented level editor is included in the Spectrum version which can be accessed from the main menu by pressing the key combination EDIT-F-K.

Reviews
Sinclair User:

The game was reviewed in 1990 in Dragon #158 by Hartley, Patricia, and Kirk Lesser in "The Role of Computers" column, as part of the Mastertronic MEGA Pack of 10 games previously released in Europe. The reviewers gave the game 1 out of 5 stars, stating "You’re inside a spaceship trying to find a princess in distress; a really dumb game".

References

External links

Future Knight at Lemon 64

1986 video games
Amstrad CPC games
Commodore 64 games
MSX games
Platform games
Video games scored by Ben Daglish
ZX Spectrum games
Video games developed in the United Kingdom